Golden is a proprietary knowledge base and online encyclopedia that combines elements of a wiki encyclopedia and database, operated by the American company Golden Recursion Inc. Its founders state that much of the information in it is generated from public databases and using machine learning techniques.

It positions itself as an alternative to Wikipedia that avoids the problem of Wikipedia's  "arbitrary notability threshold".

Marc Andreessen is a member of the company's board.

Founding source 
In 2016, founder Jude Gomila sold Heyzap and started thinking about what he could do in the future to create social value. In the process, Jude found himself doing interest research with a lack of organization in existing human knowledge, and this was more evident in emerging technologies, new startups, and creative ideas. People generally search for information through Google, Wikipedia, Bing, DuckDuckGo, Quora, StackExchange, Github and other channels, but the network information needs to be combined in the form of academic papers, documentaries, videos, podcasts, extended readings, guides and metadata.

There are also better technologies today, such as artificial intelligence systems, fully automated and unsupervised language writing systems, WYSIWYG editors, cheap cloud storage/processing, automated spelling/grammar checking techniques, graph databases, and tools like Github's collaboration system provides good technical resources for establishing Golden.

References

Knowledge bases
American online encyclopedias
American companies established in 2019
English-language encyclopedias
Internet properties established in 2019